The Windhoek Synagogue is an Orthodox Jewish Synagogue in Windhoek, the capital city of Namibia. It is the only active synagogue in the country and is owned and operated by the Windhoek Hebrew Congregation. The synagogue was founded by Rabbi I. L. Landau in 1924.

In November 2015, the community announced plans to close and sell the synagogue, as none of the remaining members of the community viewed themselves as Orthodox Jews.

Another synagogue existed in Keetmanshoop from 1927 and 1973.

See also 

 History of the Jews in Namibia

Bibliography 

 Windhoek Hebrew Congregation (Hrsg.): Jewish Life in South West Africa, Namibia – A History. Windhoek 2014, ISBN 978-99945-78-94-8.

External links 

 Fotos der Synagoge (englisch)
 Geschichte und Zeichnungen der Synagoge (englisch)

References 

1920s architecture
Buildings and structures in Windhoek
Jews and Judaism in Namibia
Orthodox Judaism in Africa
Orthodox synagogues
Synagogues in Africa
Buildings and structures completed in 1924